Lophiomus setigerus, the Blackmouth angler, is a species of goosefish found in the Indian and western Pacific Oceans where it occurs at depths of from .  This species grows to a length of  TL.

This species is commercially harvested for human consumption. Most notably, in South Korea where it is known as agwi (아귀), it is the key ingredient of agujjim (아구찜). This was originally invented in the town of Masan: historically, agwi fish were discarded by the fishermen, as they were considered unsellable due to their ugly appearance. But around the mid-20th century, the food stall cooks at the Masan market took up the challenge to turn the waste into a tasty dish. As it turned out, preparing L. setigerus in jjim style (steamed in a spicy and hot marinade) brought its agreeable flavor and peculiar texture out well, besides delivering a healthy dose of protein. Agwi is now a nationally popular dish, with many scores of specialist restaurants found across the country.

As a side note, L. setigerus is traditionally combined in agwi with the  ascidian tunicate Styela clava (mideodeok, 미더덕). Like this fish, use of tunicates as food is rather unusual.

References

Lophiidae
Fish described in 1797
Taxa named by Martin Vahl